The Old Livery Stable in Fountain, Colorado is a historic stable which was built in 1893 as part of a small hotel complex.  It housed horses of hotel guests.  With the rise of automobiles such use ended and the stable decayed.  The hotel was damaged in a fire in the 1940s, then partially repaired to serve as a rooming house, then demolished to make way for new buildings;  only the stable remains.

Its NRHP nomination states that the stable is:a vestige of the life and commerce of an earlier day in Fountain. Although vernacular in style, the architecture is of particular interest. The thick, heavy walls; the use of crude stones; the massiveness of the construction; and the integrated use of the dormer and cupola in a stable all reflect a time and a place where there was relatively little architectural knowledge, a time and a place where the builders drew on their rough experiences to build a utilitarian structure to serve the hotel trade. Today the Old Livery Stable stands as a landmark in downtown Fountain.

See also
National Register of Historic Places listings in El Paso County, Colorado

References

External links
 Directory of Colorado State Register Properties

Fountain, Colorado
Commercial buildings on the National Register of Historic Places in Colorado
Commercial buildings completed in 1893
Transportation buildings and structures in El Paso County, Colorado
National Register of Historic Places in El Paso County, Colorado
Stables
1893 establishments in Colorado